Matt Levin (born January 8, 1975) is an American professional stock car racing driver. He currently competes part-time in the NASCAR K&N Pro Series West, driving the No. 10 Chevrolet SS for Levin Racing.

Racing career
Levin debuted in the K&N Pro Series West in March 2015 at Kern County Raceway Park.

During the NAPA Auto Parts 150 at Kern County in April 2016, Levin was involved in a spectacular accident just as they were taking a late restart. After Blaine Perkins got spun by Julia Landauer, Levin spun her out in reaction and then while trying to get away, made contact with Perkins and tipped over onto his roof. He climbed from the wreckage without injury.

In 2019, Levin scored his first career top-five finish at his home track in Tucson.

Personal life
Matt Levin is from Tucson, Arizona.

Motorsports career results

NASCAR
(key) (Bold – Pole position awarded by qualifying time. Italics – Pole position earned by points standings or practice time. * – Most laps led.)

K&N Pro Series East

K&N Pro Series West

References

External links

 

1975 births
Living people
Sportspeople from Tucson, Arizona
Racing drivers from Tucson, Arizona
Racing drivers from Arizona
NASCAR drivers